Thua khiao tom namtan is a Thai dessert made from mung beans.

See also
 List of Thai desserts

References 

Thai desserts and snacks